Booty Star: Glock Tawk is the 17th album released by rapper, Andre Nickatina. It was released for Nickatina's own label Nickypearl.com, distributed by Sumo Records and was produced by Andre Nickatina, Nick Peace, Freddy Machete, Krushadelic, K-Maxx, DJ Pause, Rob Lo and TD Camp.

Track listing
"7 Letters Coked Out"- 2:01 
"Booty Star (Glock Tawk)"- 2:24 
"Zestways" (Coke Remix)- 3:31 (Featuring Husalah, and The Jacka)
"San Francisco Bay"- 3:33 
"Pineapple Juice"- 3:03 
"3 So What A.M. So What"- 2:48 
"W-X-I'll Tell U-Y"- 3:12 
"My Friend Mac Dre"- 1:43 
"She's In Love With The Camera"- 3:05 
"Contract Out On Cupid"- 3:35 
"Book Called Fillmoe"- 3:49 
"Baddest Bitch On The Planet"- 2:50 
"U-N-Her"- 3:32 (Featuring San Quinn)  
"Bonus"- 3:12 (Featuring Shag Nasty)

2007 albums
Andre Nickatina albums